A jagir, also spelled as jageer, was a type of feudal land grant in the Indian subcontinent at the foundation of its Jagirdar (Zamindar) system. It developed during the Islamic rule era of the Indian subcontinent, starting in the early 13th century, wherein the powers to govern and collect tax from an estate was granted to an appointee of the state. The tenants were considered to be in the servitude of the jagirdar. There were two forms of jagir, one being conditional and the other unconditional. The conditional jagir required the governing family to maintain troops and provide their service to the state when asked. The land grant was called iqta, usually for a holder's lifetime, and the land reverted to the state upon the death of the jagirdar.The jagirdar system was introduced by the Delhi Sultanate, and continued during the Mughal Empire, but with a difference. In the Mughal times, the jagirdar collected taxes which paid his salary and the rest to the Mughal treasury, while the administration and military authority was given to a separate Mughal appointee. After the collapse of Mughal Empire, the system of jagirs was retained by Marathas, Rajput, Jat, and Sikh jat kingdoms, and later in a form by the British East India Company.

 Definition Jagir (Devanagari: जागीर) is a Persian word, and means "place holder".

The Supreme Court of India used the following definition of jagir  Rajasthan Land Reforms and Resumption of Jagirs Act (Rajasthan Act VI of 1952) in its Thakur Amar Singhji vs State Of Rajasthan (And Other ...) in a 15 April 1955 judgement: 

 Succession 
A jagir was technically a feudal life estate, as the grant reverted to the state upon the jagirdar's death. However, in practice, jagirs became hereditary to the male lineal heir of the jagirdar. The family was thus the de facto ruler of the territory, earned income from part of the tax revenues and delivered the rest to the treasury of the state during the Islamic rule period, and later in parts of India that came under Afghan, Sikh and Rajput rulers. The jagirdar did not act alone, but appointed administrative layers for revenue collection. These positions, according to Shakti Kak, were called patwari, tahsildar, amil, fotedar, munsif, qanungo, chaudhri, dewan, rao and others.

 13th-century origin and successors 
This feudal system of land ownership is referred to as the jagirdar system. The system was introduced by the Sultans of Delhi from the 13th century onwards, was later adopted by the Mughal Empire, and continued under the British East India Company.
 
Some Hindu jagirdars were converted into Muslim vassal states under Mughal imperial sway, such as the nawwabs of Kurnool. Most princely states of India during the colonial British Raj era were jagirdars such as Mohrampur Jagir. Shortly following independence from the British Crown in 1947, the jagirdar'' system was abolished by the Indian government in 1951.

See also 

 Indian honorifics
 Desmukh
 Indian feudalism
 Feudalism in Pakistan
 Kulkarni
 Lambardar
 Mankari
 Mansabdar
 Patil
 Saranjamdar 
 Sardar
 Zamindar
 Ghatwals and Mulraiyats

References 

Feudalism in Bangladesh
Feudalism in Pakistan
Indian feudalism
Indian words and phrases
Administrative divisions of India
Types of administrative division